Dragan Durdevic (born 26 July 1976) is an Australian former professional rugby league footballer of Serbian descent.

Professional playing career
Durdevic made his NRL début with the Manly-Warringah club on 31 August 1997 against the South Sydney Rabbitohs at Brookvale Oval in a 36–18 victory. Durdevic made one further appearance for the Manly side before moving to the Northern Eagles for the 2000 NRL season where he went on to make nine appearances and score a try. Durdevic finished his career in France with the Villeneuve Leopards in 2003.

References

1976 births
Living people
Australian people of Serbian descent
Australian rugby league players
Manly Warringah Sea Eagles players
Northern Eagles players
Rugby league players from Sydney
Rugby league second-rows
Rugby league props
Villeneuve Leopards players